Jacques Gestraut (born 24 September 1939) is a former French cyclist. He competed in the individual road race at the 1960 Summer Olympics.

References

External links
 

1939 births
Living people
French male cyclists
Olympic cyclists of France
Cyclists at the 1960 Summer Olympics
Sportspeople from Valenciennes
Cyclists from Hauts-de-France
20th-century French people